Valencia CF once again reached the Champions League final. Finishing only 5th in La Liga, Valencia focused most of its resources on the international competition, a late goal from new signing John Carew helping them knock Arsenal out of the tournament in the quarter finals. The semis consisted of going against Leeds United, not present at that level for more than 25 years. Winning 3–0 at home following the goalless draw in the first match, Los Che became one of the relatively few clubs reaching consecutive finals, facing Bayern Munich.

In the final itself, Valencia got a penalty kick straightaway, which was converted by captain Gaizka Mendieta. A few minutes later Mehmet Scholl failed to convert a penalty, which Santiago Cañizares saved, but Stefan Effenberg later scored from a second penalty kick. The penalty taking was not over, since the result was 1-1 after extra time, and Bayern got the upper hand in the shootout, with Valencia coming agonizingly close to becoming the third Spanish club to win the Champions League.

Following the end of the season, Gaizka Mendieta was sold to Lazio for a club-record fee. Coach Héctor Cúper was recruited by Inter to break their title drought, being replaced by surprise choice Rafael Benítez.

Players

Squad information

Transfers

Left club during season

Competitions

La Liga

League table

Results by round

Matches

Topscorers 
  Juan Sánchez 12
  John Carew 11
  Gaizka Mendieta 9
  Vicente 5
  Rubén Baraja 4

Copa del Rey

Round of 64

Round of 32

UEFA Champions League

Qualifying

1st Group Stage

2nd Group Stage

Quarter-final

Semi-finals

Final

Statistics

Players statistics

Sources 
 Soccerbase - Valencia CF

References 

Valencia CF seasons
Valencia